Vâlcelele is a commune in Călărași County, Muntenia, Romania. It is composed of two villages, Vâlcelele and Floroaica.

Natives
 Florența Albu (1934–2000), poet

References

Communes in Călărași County
Localities in Muntenia